Chattaway is a surname. Notable people with the surname include:
 
 Frederick Daniel Chattaway  (1860–1944), Fellow of the Royal Society, elected 1907 
 Jay Chattaway (born 1946), American composer

See also
 Chataway